Ultramarine is a deep blue color pigment which was originally made by grinding lapis lazuli into a powder. The name comes from the Latin ultramarinus, literally 'beyond the sea', because the pigment was imported into Europe from mines in Afghanistan by Italian traders during the 14th and 15th centuries.

Ultramarine was the finest and most expensive blue used by Renaissance painters. It was often used for the robes of the Virgin Mary and symbolized holiness and humility.  It remained an extremely expensive pigment until a synthetic ultramarine was invented in 1826.

Structure 

The pigment consists primarily of a zeolite-based mineral containing small amounts of polysulfides. It occurs in nature as a proximate component of lapis lazuli containing a blue cubic mineral called lazurite. In the Colour Index International, the pigment of ultramarine is identified as P. Blue 29 77007. 

The major component of lazurite is a complex sulfur-containing sodium-silicate (Na8–10Al6Si6O24S2–4), which makes ultramarine the most complex of all mineral pigments. Some chloride is often present in the crystal lattice as well. The blue color of the pigment is due to the  radical anion, which contains an unpaired electron.

Shades and variations

International Klein Blue (IKB) 
International Klein Blue a deep blue hue first mixed by the French artist Yves Klein.

Electric

Electric ultramarine is the tone of ultramarine that is halfway between blue and violet on the RGB (HSV) color wheel, the expression of the HSV color space of the RGB color model.

Production 
In 1990, an estimated 20,000 tons of ultramarine were produced industrially. The raw materials used in the manufacture of synthetic ultramarine are the following:
 white kaolin,
 anhydrous sodium sulfate (Na2SO4),
 anhydrous sodium carbonate (Na2CO3),
 powdered sulfur,
 powdered charcoal or relatively ash-free coal, or colophony in lumps.

The preparation is typically made in steps:
 The first part of the process takes place at 700 to 750 °C in a closed furnace, so that sulfur, carbon and organic substances give reducing conditions. This yields a yellow-green product sometimes used as a pigment.
 In the second step, air or sulfur dioxide at 350 to 450 °C is used to oxidise sulfide in the intermediate product to S2 and Sn chromophore molecules, resulting in the blue (or purple, pink or red) pigment.
 The mixture is heated in a kiln, sometimes in brick-sized amounts. 
 The resultant solids are then ground and washed, as is the case in any other insoluble pigment's manufacturing process; the chemical reaction produces large amounts of sulfur dioxide. (Flue-gas desulfurization is thus essential to its manufacture where SO2 pollution is regulated.)

"Ultramarine poor in silica" is obtained by fusing a mixture of soft clay, sodium sulfate, charcoal, sodium carbonate, and sulfur. The product is at first white, but soon turns green "green ultramarine" when it is mixed with sulfur and heated. The sulfur burns, and a fine blue pigment is obtained. "Ultramarine rich in silica" is generally obtained by heating a mixture of pure clay, very fine white sand, sulfur, and charcoal in a muffle furnace. A blue product is obtained at once, but a red tinge often results. The different ultramarines—green, blue, red, and violet—are finely ground and washed with water.

Synthetic ultramarine is a more vivid blue than natural ultramarine, since the particles in synthetic ultramarine are smaller and more uniform than the particles in natural ultramarine and therefore diffuse light more evenly. Its color is unaffected by light nor by contact with oil or lime as used in painting. Hydrochloric acid immediately bleaches it with liberation of hydrogen sulfide. Even a small addition of zinc oxide to the reddish varieties especially causes a considerable diminution in the intensity of the color.

Structure and classification of ultramarines 
Ultramarine is the aluminosilicate zeolite with a sodalite structure. Sodalite consists of interconnected aluminosilicate cages. Some of these cages contain polysulfide groups that are the chromophore (color centre). The negative charge on these ions is balanced by  ions that also occupy these cages.

The chromophore is proposed to be  or S4.

Applications 
Synthetic ultramarine, being very cheap, is largely used for wall painting, the printing of paper hangings and calico, etc., and also as a corrective for the yellowish tinge often present in things meant to be white, such as linen, paper, etc. Bluing or "laundry blue" is a suspension of synthetic ultramarine, or the chemically different prussian blue, that is used for this purpose when washing white clothes. It is often found in make-up such as mascaras or eye shadows.

Large quantities are used in the manufacture of paper, and especially for producing a kind of pale blue writing paper which was popular in Britain. During World War I, the RAF painted the outer roundels with a color made from ultramarine blue. This became BS 108(381C) aircraft blue. It was replaced in the 1960s by a new color made on phthalocyanine blue, called BS110(381C) roundel blue.

History 
The name derives from Middle Latin , literally "beyond the sea" because it was imported from Asia by sea. In the past, it has also been known as azzurrum ultramarine, . The first recorded use of ultramarine as a color name in English was in 1598.

The first noted use of lapis lazuli as a pigment can be seen in the 6th and 7th-century AD cave paintings in Afghanistani Zoroastrian and Buddhist temples, near the most famous source of the mineral. Lapis lazuli has been identified in Chinese paintings from the 10th and 11th centuries, in Indian mural paintings from the 11th, 12th, and 17th centuries, and on Anglo-Saxon and Norman illuminated manuscripts from c.1100.

Middle Ages and the Renaissance 

During the Renaissance, ultramarine was the finest and most expensive blue that could be used by painters. The 15th century artist Cennino Cennini wrote in his painters' handbook: "Ultramarine blue is a glorious, lovely and absolutely perfect pigment beyond all the pigments. It would not be possible to say anything about or do anything to it which would not make it more so." Natural ultramarine is the most difficult pigment to grind by hand, and for all except the highest quality of mineral, sheer grinding and washing produces only a pale grayish blue powder. 

At the beginning of the 13th century, an improved method came into use, described by Cennino Cennini in the 15th century. This process consisted of mixing the ground material with melted wax, resins, and oils, wrapping the resulting mass in a cloth, and then kneading it in a dilute lye solution. The blue particles collect at the bottom of the pot, while the impurities and colorless crystals remain. This process was performed at least three times, with each successive extraction generating a lower quality material. The final extraction, consisting largely of colorless material as well as a few blue particles, brings forth ultramarine ash which is prized as a glaze for its pale blue transparency.

The pigment was most extensively used during the 14th through 15th centuries, as its brilliance complemented the vermilion and gold of illuminated manuscripts and Italian panel paintings. It was valued chiefly on account of its brilliancy of tone and its inertness in opposition to sunlight, oil, and slaked lime. It is, however, extremely susceptible to even minute and dilute mineral acids and acid vapors. Dilute HCl, HNO3, and H2SO4 rapidly destroy the blue color, producing hydrogen sulfide (H2S) in the process. Acetic acid attacks the pigment at a much slower rate than mineral acids. 

Ultramarine was only used for frescoes when it was applied secco because frescoes' absorption rate made its use cost prohibitive. The pigment was mixed with a binding medium like egg to form a tempera and applied over dry plaster, such as in Giotto di Bondone's frescos in the Cappella degli Scrovegni or the Arena Chapel in Padua.

European artists used the pigment sparingly, reserving their highest quality blues for the robes of Mary and the Christ child. As a result of the high price, artists sometimes economized by using a cheaper blue, azurite, for under painting. Most likely imported to Europe through Venice, the pigment was seldom seen in German art or art from countries north of Italy. Due to a shortage of azurite in the late 16th and 17th century, the price for the already-expensive ultramarine increased dramatically.

In the 17th and 18th century 

Johannes Vermeer made extensive use of ultramarine in his paintings. The turban of the Girl with a Pearl Earring is painted with a mixture of ultramarine and lead white, with a thin glaze of pure ultramarine over it. In Lady Standing at a Virginal, the young woman's dress is painted with a mixture of ultramarine and green earth, and ultramarine was used to add shadows in the flesh tones. Scientific analysis by the National Gallery in London of Lady Standing at a Virginal showed that the ultramarine in the blue seat cushion in the foreground had degraded and become paler with time; it would have been a deeper blue when originally painted.

19th century – the discovery of synthetic ultramarine 
The beginning of the development of artificial ultramarine blue was known from Goethe. In about 1787, he observed the blue deposits on the walls of lime kilns near Palermo in Sicily. He was aware of the use of these glassy deposits as a substitute for lapis lazuli in decorative applications. He did not mention if it was suitable to grind for a pigment.

In 1814, Tassaert observed the spontaneous formation of a blue compound, very similar to ultramarine, if not identical with it, in a lime kiln at St. Gobain. Processes were devised by Jean Baptiste Guimet (1826) and by Christian Gmelin (1828), then professor of chemistry in Tübingen. While Guimet kept his process a secret, Gmelin published his, and became the originator of the "artificial ultramarine" industry.

General terminology 
Ultramarine is a blue made from natural lapis lazuli, or its synthetic equivalent which is sometimes called "French Ultramarine". Variants of the pigment "ultramarine red", "ultramarine green", "ultramarine violet" are known, and are based on similar chemistry and crystal structure.

More generally "ultramarine blue" can refer to a vivid blue. The term "ultramarine green" indicates a dark green, barium chromate is sometimes referred to as "ultramarine yellow". Ultramarine pigment has also been termed "Gmelin's blue", "Guimet's blue", "New blue", "Oriental blue" and "Permanent blue".

See also 
 Blue pigments
 RAL 5002 Ultramarine blue

Notes

Further reading 
 
 
 Mangla, Ravi (8 June 2015), "True blue: a brief history of ultramarine", Paris Review—Daily.
 Plesters, J. (1993), "Ultramarine Blue, Natural and Artificial", in Artists’ Pigments. A Handbook of Their History and Characteristics, Vol. 2: A. Roy (Ed.) Oxford University Press, p. 37-66

External links 

 Discussion of ultramarine in an article on blue pigments in early Sienese paintings from The Journal of the American Institute for Conservation
 National Gallery essay on the altered appearance of ultramarine in the paintings of Vermeer
 Ultramarine natural, ColourLex
 Ultramarine artificial, ColourLex
 Shades and tints and color harmonies of ultramarine, HTMLCSScolor.com
 More shades and tints and color harmonies of ultramarine, HTMLCSScolor.com
 An alternative ultramarine color (#5A7CC2) from Pantone, pantone.com

Quaternary colors
Aluminosilicates
Inorganic pigments
Zeolites
Sulfides
Shades of blue